Roberto Colombo (5 January 1927 in Casatenovo  6 July 1957 in Francorchamps) was an Italian Grand Prix motorcycle road racer who competed for the MV Agusta factory racing team. His best seasons were 1956 and 1957 when he finished fourth in the 250cc world championship. Colombo was killed during practice for the 1957 Belgian Grand Prix.

Motorcycle Grand Prix results Roberto Colombo Isle of Man TT statistics 
Points system from 1950 to 1968:

(Races in italics indicate fastest lap)

References

1927 births
1957 deaths
Sportspeople from the Province of Lecco
Italian motorcycle racers
125cc World Championship riders
250cc World Championship riders
350cc World Championship riders
Isle of Man TT riders
Motorcycle racers who died while racing
Sport deaths in Belgium